Begum Khurshid Mirza  (Urdu:   بیگم خورشید مرزا   ), also known by her screen name as Renuka Devi (1918 – 1989), was a Pakistani television actress and a film actress in the pre-partition era.

Early life, Family and Education
Begum Khurshid Mirza was born as Khurshid Jehan on 4 March 1918 in Aligarh to Sheikh Abdullah and Waheed Jahan Begum, the founders of Women's College, Aligarh. Her father was a practising lawyer and philanthropist who was keen to bring education and enlightenment to Muslim women. Her elder sister Rashid Jahan was a prominent Urdu language writer and one of the founding members of the Progressive Writers' Movement. Mirza married in 1935 to a police officer Akbar Mirza and migrated to Pakistan in the wake of partition of India in 1947. Mirza completed her education with a Master's degree in English in 1963.

Film career
Khurshid Mirza was introduced to Indian cinema by Devika Rani of Bombay Talkies under the screen name Renuka Devi. In her interview given to Lutfullah Khan, Mirza recalled Rani named her after her deceased sister.

She acted in Jeevan Prabhat (1937), Bhabhi (1938), Bhakti (1939), Bari Didi (1939) and Naya Sansar (1941), and performed as a leading lady in box-office hits Sahara (1943), Ghulami (1945) and Samrat Chandragupta (1945). She also sang for some of her movies.

She announced her retirement from the film industry in February 1945.

Films in India

Films in Pakistan

Television career
When Pakistan Television Corporation (PTV) began its broadcast transmission in 1964 and its TV drama serials started earning household fame, there was a need for professionals to train the young media crew. It was a Haseena Moin's serial, entitled Kiran Kahani (1972), which rediscovered Khurshid Mirza as a senior actress. Her performance gained her rave reviews, even though she said in a later interview that it was slightly off-key. The next serial she worked in was Zair, Zabar, Pesh, also written by Haseena Moin. Her performance was regarded by many as one of the finest acting performances in that role, and this set the tone for the rest of her acting career.

She remained a character actress for PTV, Karachi television centre and had nearly a dozen of popular drama series to her credit, including Uncle Urfi (1972), Parchhaiyan (1976) and a special play Massi Sherbate written by Fatima Surayya Bajia. She retired in 1985, with her last performance coming in PTV drama series Ana (1984).

PTV drama series 
 Kiran Kahani (1972)
 Uncle Urfi (1972)
 Zair, Zabar, Pesh (1974)
 Parchhaiyan (1976)
 Rumi
 Dhund 
 Silver Jubilee
 Choti Choti Baatein
 Shama
 Afshan
 Ana (1984)
 Aagahi
 Massi Sherbate
 Show Shaa
 Panah
 Agar Nama Bar Milay

Literary and Art Works
Begum Khurshid Mirza penned her autobiography The Uprooted Sappling, which appeared in the Pakistani monthly Herald as a nine-part serial, from August 1982 to April 1983. Later, the collection was compiled in 2005 as a book by her daughter, Lubna Kazim

 A Woman of Substance: The Memoirs Of Begum Khurshid Mirza (an autobiography, edited by Lubna Kazim. Delhi: Zubaan 2005)

From 1960 onwards, she was involved in several literary activities, writing short stories for prestigious Urdu magazines Saqi published by Shahid Ahmad Dehlvi. Later, she compiled all her short stories with the cover title Mehru ki Bachee. 

During her days in Quetta, Mirza ran the women's programme and wrote plays for Radio Pakistan. She also composed religious verses under the pseudonym Shola and sermons for Milad meetings.

Social works
After migration to Pakistan, Khurshid Mirza worked for the All Pakistan Women's Association (APWA) as a volunteer helping destitute women. When her husband was transferred to Quetta, she took charge of the APWA centre in a rural area called Ismail Killi. She had also aired programmes on women's issues on radio.

Awards and recognition
IFFI Best Actor Award (Female) (1965) for "Nirjan Saikate" at 3rd IFFI

Mirza was awarded the Pride of Performance by the President of Pakistan in 1984.
She got PTV Best Actress Award in the PTV play Afshan in 1982.

In 2004, an event was arranged to pay tributes to Begum Khurshid Mirza in Lahore, where many Pakistani dignitaries gathered to recall her efforts for the tribal women during her stay in Quetta in the 1950s where she also used to hold events to raise funds for All Pakistan Women's Association (APWA).

Death
After her retirement, Mirza moved to Lahore, where she died on 8 February 1989. She was buried in Mian Mir graveyard.

References

External links
 
 A Few Rare Pictures of Renuka Devi: https://www.flickr.com/photos/rashid_ashraf/31821508491/in/dateposted/

1918 births
People from Aligarh
20th-century Pakistani women singers
Pakistani film actresses
Hindi-language singers
Pakistani radio personalities
20th-century Indian women singers
20th-century Indian singers
Punjabi-language singers
Pakistani television actresses
PTV Award winners
Pakistani women singers
1989 deaths
Radio personalities from Lahore
Urdu-language singers
Recipients of the Pride of Performance
Actresses from Karachi
20th-century Pakistani actresses
Actresses in Hindi cinema
Aligarh Muslim University alumni
Actresses in Bengali cinema
IFFI Best Actor (Female) winners
Indian film actresses
Singers from Lahore
Indian musical theatre actresses
Actresses in Urdu cinema
Indian stage actresses
Pakistani stage actresses